West Hants, officially named the West Hants Regional Municipality, is a regional municipality in Hants County, Nova Scotia, Canada.

It occupies the western half of Hants County, running from the Minas Basin to the boundary with Halifax County, sharing this boundary with the Municipality of the District of East Hants.

The Municipality of the District of West Hants amalgamated with Windsor on April 1, 2020, becoming the Region of Windsor and West Hants Municipality. It was renamed as West Hants Regional Municipality on October 6, 2020.

Demographics 

Famous people
The poet George Elliot Clarke is from West Hants. His poem, "West Hants County" tells of the difficult condition of black workers in the gypsum mines at one time in its history.

See also
 List of municipalities in Nova Scotia

References

External links 

Populated places in Hants County, Nova Scotia
West Hants